Daniel Lambert (born January 12, 1970) is a Canadian former professional ice hockey player who played 29 games in the National Hockey League (NHL) for the Quebec Nordiques during the 1990–91 and 1991–92 seasons. The rest of his career, which lasted from 1990 to 2009, was mainly spent in the minor leagues and then the Deutsche Eishockey Liga. He has been an assistant coach of the Nashville Predators of the NHL since 2019.

Early career
Lambert grew up in the community of St. Malo, in southeastern Manitoba, and played his minor hockey in St. Malo, Steinbach, and Ste. Anne. He played one season of high school hockey in Warroad, Minnesota, before joining the Swift Current Broncos of the Western Hockey League as a 16-year-old in 1986.

Midway into his first season with the Broncos, the team bus was involved in a fatal crash that claimed the lives of four Broncos players; Lambert was not on the bus. Two seasons later, he scored 102 points in 57 regular season games. The Broncos went on to win the Memorial Cup that season; Lambert was named the Most Valuable Player of the tournament. His 244 career assists stands as a franchise record.

Professional career
Lambert was drafted 106th overall by the Quebec Nordiques in the 1989 NHL Entry Draft. From 1990 to 1992, Lambert split his time between the Fort Wayne Komets of the International Hockey League, Halifax Citadels of the American Hockey League, and Nordiques. He played a total of 29 games for the Nordiques, scoring 15 points. In June 1992, Lambert was traded to the Winnipeg Jets and spent the entire 1992-93 season with the Moncton Hawks, their AHL affiliate. Lambert did not play a game in the NHL that season and decided to leave to play in Finland after the season ended. He played 13 games there with HIFK before returning to North American to play for the Komets in 1993-94.

In 1994, Lambert joined the San Diego Gulls of the IHL. The team played one season in San Diego before moving to Los Angeles for one season, and finally settled in Long Beach, California to become the Long Beach Ice Dogs. During his five seasons with franchise, Lambert was one of the IHL's premier defenceman, scoring 308 points in 353 games. He was named an all-star four times and received the Governor's Trophy as the league's top defenceman in 1998. He also led all defencemen in scoring twice.

Lambert signed a contract with the Kölner Haie of the Deutsche Eishockey Liga in 1999, helping the team win the Spengler Cup that season. After one season in Cologne, he played three with the Krefeld Pinguine, one with the Hamburg Freezers and five with the Hannover Scorpions. Lambert helped lead Krefeld to a DEL championship in 2003.

Lambert retired from professional hockey in 2009.

International competition
Lambert had the opportunity to play for Canada on a number of occasions in international competition, most notably at the 1989 World Junior Championships in Anchorage, Alaska. In 2005, Lambert was named as Team Canada's captain for the Deutschland Cup.

Coaching career
After retiring as a player in 2009, Lambert joined the Kelowna Rockets organization, first as an assistant coach and then as the head coach. As head coach, he led the Rockets to a runner-up finish at the 2015 Memorial Cup. He also served as one of Canada's three head coaches for the 2014 World Under-17 Hockey Challenge.

Lambert was hired as an assistant coach by the Buffalo Sabres in July 2015. On May 16, 2016, in a reorganization within the Sabres coaching staff, Lambert was assigned head coaching duties of the Rochester Americans. Lambert was fired as Amerks head coach at the end of the 2016-17 season but was then hired to coach the Spokane Chiefs of the Western Hockey League.

After two seasons as head coach of the Spokane Chiefs, Lambert left the organization in June 2019 to become an assistant coach with the Nashville Predators.

Personal
Lambert and his wife, Melanie, have three daughters.

Career statistics

Regular season and playoffs

International

Awards
 WHL East First All-Star Team – 1989 & 1990

References

External links
 

1970 births
Living people
Buffalo Sabres coaches
Canadian ice hockey coaches
Canadian expatriate ice hockey players in Finland
Canadian expatriate ice hockey players in Germany
Canadian ice hockey defencemen
Fort Wayne Komets players
Franco-Manitoban people
Halifax Citadels players
Hamburg Freezers players
Hannover Scorpions players
HIFK (ice hockey) players
Ice hockey people from Winnipeg
Kelowna Rockets coaches
Kölner Haie players
Krefeld Pinguine players
Long Beach Ice Dogs (IHL) players
Los Angeles Ice Dogs players
Moncton Hawks players
Nashville Predators coaches
People from Saint Boniface, Winnipeg
Quebec Nordiques draft picks
Quebec Nordiques players
Rochester Americans coaches
San Diego Gulls (IHL) players
Spokane Chiefs coaches
Swift Current Broncos players